Roulletia is an extinct genus of sand sharks (family Odontaspididae). It was described by Romain Vullo, Henri Cappetta, and Didier Néraudeau in 2007, and the type species is R. bureaui, which existed during the upper Cenomanian of what is now France. The genus was named after its type locality, Roullet-Saint-Estèphe, while the species epithet honours Michel Bureau, an amateur paleontologist who gathered the material for the species. Another species, R. canadensis, was described from the Cenomanian of Canada by Charlie J. Underwood and Stephen L. Cumbaa in 2010. The species epithet refers to the country in which it was discovered. It has been suggested tentatively this genus may be related to Haimirichia, which has been placed in its own family (Haimirichiidae) based on soft-tissue preservation.

References

Odontaspididae
Late Cretaceous fish of North America
Cretaceous fish of Europe
Fossil taxa described in 2007